The 1951 Stetson Hatters football team was an American football team that represented Stetson University as an independent during the 1951 college football season. Led by Joe McMullen in his second and final year as head coach, the Hatters compiled a record of 8–1–2. They were invited to the Tangerine Bowl, where they beat Arkansas State.

Schedule

References

Stetson
Stetson Hatters football seasons
Citrus Bowl champion seasons
Stetson Hatters football